The Americas Zone was one of the three zones of the regional Davis Cup competition in 2000.

In the Americas Zone there were four different tiers, called groups, in which teams compete against each other to advance to the upper tier. Winners in Group II advanced to the Americas Zone Group I. Teams who lost their respective ties competed in the relegation play-offs, with winning teams remaining in Group II, whereas teams who lost their play-offs were relegated to the Americas Zone Group III in 2001.

Participating nations

Draw

 and  relegated to Group III in 2001.
 promoted to Group I in 2001.

First round

Venezuela vs. Uruguay

El Salvador vs. Paraguay

Guatemala vs. Cuba

Costa Rica vs. Mexico

Second round

Venezuela vs. Paraguay

Guatemala vs. Mexico

Relegation play-offs

Uruguay vs. El Salvador

Costa Rica vs. Cuba

Third round

Mexico vs. Venezuela

References

External links
Davis Cup official website

Davis Cup Americas Zone
Americas Zone Group II